Fagraea gracilipes is a species of flowering plant in the family Gentianaceae. It is endemic to Fiji, where it is known from only four of the islands. It is harvested for its valuable wood. In Fiji, it is threatened by overexploitation and the destruction by development of its coastal habitat.

References

gracilipes
Flora of Fiji
Near threatened plants
Near threatened biota of Oceania
Taxonomy articles created by Polbot